The William A. Buckingham House, also known as Buckingham Memorial Hall, is a historic house a fraternal hall at 307 Main Street in Norwich, Connecticut.  It was built in 1847 by William A. Buckingham, whose later political career included terms as mayor of Norwich and Governor of Connecticut (the latter during the American Civil War).  Since 1898, it has housed a variety of veterans' and other service organizations, as well as government offices.  The house was listed on the National Register of Historic Places on April 29, 1982.

Description and history
The Buckingham House is located in downtown Norwich, on the south side of Main Street just east of the Otis Library.  It is a -story brick structure, with a main block three bays wide, topped by a hip roof with a steep gable above what was originally the main entrance.  The roof has extended eaves, which are adorned with modillion blocks  A recessed wing extends to the left side, fronted by a single-story porch covered by a curving metal roof and supported by posts with open fretwork.  The interior has been extensively altered, retaining only a small number of original features, including fireplaces.

The house was built in 1847 for William A. Buckingham, whose later political career included terms as mayor of Norwich and Governor of Connecticut (the latter during the American Civil War).  Buckingham is known to have had both Abraham Lincoln and Ulysses S. Grant as guests.  The house was purchased in 1898 by the local chapter of the Grand Army of the Republic, a Civil War veterans organization.  In the early 1980s it was the meeting place of Sedgwick Camp #4 of the Sons of Union Veterans of the Civil War, a Union Civil War descendants organization.  It now houses a variety of government and social service offices.

See also
National Register of Historic Places listings in New London County, Connecticut

References

Houses on the National Register of Historic Places in Connecticut
Houses completed in 1847
Houses in Norwich, Connecticut
National Register of Historic Places in New London County, Connecticut
1847 establishments in Connecticut